The 2007 Luch-Energiya Vladivostok season was the club's 3rd season in the Russian Premier League, and their second since 1993. Luch-Energiya Vladivostok finished the season in 14th, narrowly avoiding relegation on matches won, and were knocked out of the 2007–08 Russian Cup by Metallurg Krasnoyarsk at the Round of 32 stage.

Squad

On loan

Left club during season

Transfers

In

Loans in

Out

Loans out

Released

Competitions

Premier League

Results by round

Results

League table

Russian Cup

2007-08

Squad statistics

Appearances and goals

|-
|colspan="14"|Players away from the club on loan:
|-
|colspan="14"|Players who appeared for Luch-Energiya Vladivostok but left during the season:

|}

Goal scorers

Clean sheets

Disciplinary record

Notes

References

FC Luch Vladivostok seasons
Luch-Energiya Vladivostok